Hudești is a commune in Botoșani County, Western Moldavia, Romania. It is composed of six villages: Alba, Baranca, Bașeu, Hudești, Mlenăuți and Vatra.

Natives
 Camelia Macoviciuc-Mihalcea

References

Communes in Botoșani County
Localities in Western Moldavia
Populated places on the Prut